Dennis Ford (3 February 1931 – 1 January 2009) was a South African swimmer. He competed at the 1952 Summer Olympics and the 1956 Summer Olympics.

References

External links
 

1931 births
2009 deaths
South African male swimmers
Olympic swimmers of South Africa
Swimmers at the 1952 Summer Olympics
Swimmers at the 1956 Summer Olympics
Sportspeople from East London, Eastern Cape
Swimmers at the 1954 British Empire and Commonwealth Games
Commonwealth Games medallists in swimming
Commonwealth Games bronze medallists for South Africa
Medallists at the 1954 British Empire and Commonwealth Games